Bruce Rankin (5 July 1879–1954) was an English footballer who played in the Football League for Everton, Manchester City and West Bromwich Albion.

References

1879 births
1954 deaths
English footballers
Association football forwards
English Football League players
Tranmere Rovers F.C. players
Everton F.C. players
West Bromwich Albion F.C. players
Manchester City F.C. players
Luton Town F.C. players
Wrexham A.F.C. players